Roderick Martin (born 27 April 1959) is a Swedish modern pentathlete. He competed at the 1984 and 1988 Summer Olympics.

References

External links
 

1959 births
Living people
Swedish male modern pentathletes
Olympic modern pentathletes of Sweden
Modern pentathletes at the 1984 Summer Olympics
Modern pentathletes at the 1988 Summer Olympics
Sportspeople from Bogotá
20th-century Swedish people